Liu Xiang (born 1 May 1981) is a former Chinese footballer.

Career statistics

Club

Notes

References

1981 births
Living people
Chinese footballers
Association football midfielders
Chinese Super League players
China League One players
Henan Songshan Longmen F.C. players
Qingdao Hailifeng F.C. players
Meizhou Hakka F.C. players
Heilongjiang Ice City F.C. players